Ariano nel Polesine is a comune (municipality) in the Province of Rovigo in the Italian region Veneto, located about  southwest of Venice and about  southeast of Rovigo.

Geography
Ariano nel Polesine borders the following municipalities: Berra, Corbola, Goro, Mesola, Papozze, Taglio di Po.

References

External links

Cities and towns in Veneto